Dewi Passarella (born 30 August 2003) is an Italian rugby union player, who plays for Benetton Rugby.His preferred position is centre.

Club career 
Signed in August 2022 as Academy Player, he made his debut for Benetton in Round 5 of the 2022–23 United Rugby Championship against .

International career 
In 2022, Passarella was named in Italy U20s squad for annual Six Nations Under 20s Championship.

References

External links

All.rugby profile
OnRugby.it profile
It's Rugby UK profile

2003 births
People from Mirano
Living people
Italian rugby union players
Rugby union centres
Benetton Rugby players